Markosyan or Markosian (Armenian: Մարկոսյան) is an Armenian surname that may refer to the following notable people:
Diana Markosian (born 1989), American artist of Armenian descent
Karen Markosyan (born 1968), Armenian football midfielder
Ned Markosian, American philosopher
Suren Markosyan (born 1984), Armenian freestyle wrestler

Armenian-language surnames
Patronymic surnames
Surnames from given names